Sysmä is a municipality of Finland. It is situated in the Päijät-Häme region. The municipality has a population of 
which 
is water. The population density is
. Neighbouring municipalities are Asikkala, Hartola, Heinola, Kuhmoinen, Luhanka, and Padasjoki. The municipality is unilingually Finnish.

Itä-Häme newspaper is established in Sysmä.

According to historians, the word sysmä means either a "dark forest" or an "uninhabited wilderness." Sysmä is also a lake in Joroinen and another lake in Ilomantsi.

History 
The first settlers in the area came from Sääksmäki, as evidenced by village names such as Voipala in Sysmä, which is named after Voipaala in Sääksmäki. Rapala may also be named after Rapola.

Sysmä was first mentioned in 1442, when it was already a separate parish. Jämsä was separated from it on the same year. Sysmä was a large parish, though most of its northern lands lacked a permanent population. The northern parts were eventually settled by Savonians and in 1561, the area became the Rautalampi parish which included most of modern Central Finland north of the Päijänne; from Toivakka to Pihtipudas.

The original dialect spoken in Sysmä was a Tavastian dialect. It was replaced by a Savonian dialect soon after Ivar Tawast killed 400 peasants from Sysmä, Jämsä and Kuhmoinen in Padasjoki during the Cudgel War. Many farms in Sysmä were left without owners, so they were taken by Savonian settlers.

Sysmä was also occasionally known in documents as Sysmäki due to association with the word mäki (hill), compare Kärsämäki which used to be Kärsämä.

Hartola was a part of Sysmä until 1784. At the time, the Hartola parish also included Joutsa, Luhanka, Leivonmäki and the western part of Pertunmaa.

Population

Sysmä has suffered chronic, steady population decline over the last 50 years. It has many alternative homes, used principally as holiday homes.

Some villages
Joutsjärvi, Karilanmaa, Kinnarila, Koivisto, Liikola, Nikkaroinen, Nuoramoinen, Onkiniemi, Otamo, Rapala, Ravioskorpi, Taipale, Unaja, Valittula, and Vintturi.

Attractions
Many summer events are held in Sysmä during which the population could even triple seasonally.

One of the most popular events is called Sysmän suvisoitto.
Kammiovuori mountain where is seven meters high glacial erratic Sysmän Linta
Another glacial erratic in Sysmä is Onkiniemen liikkuva kivi.

Famous people
 Usko Kantola, actor
 Pekka Streng, musician
 Olavi Virta, singer
 Lauri Rapala, founder of Rapala
 Onni Schildt, politician
 Ernst Tandefelt, Swedo-Finnish nobleman and assassin

References

External links

Municipality of Sysmä – Official website, finnish, english, and russian
 Sysmä's Prehistory

 
Populated places established in the 1440s